Simon of Dammartin (1180 – 21 September 1239) was a son of Alberic III of Dammartin (Aubry de Dammartin) and his wife Mathildis of Clermont,  heiress to the county of Clermont and daughter of Renaud II, Count of Clermont.

Biography
Simon was the brother of Renaud I, Count of Dammartin, who had abducted the heiress of Boulogne, and forced her to marry him. It is thought that in order to strengthen the alliance with the Dammartins, King Philip Augustus of France allowed Simon to marry Marie, Countess of Ponthieu, who was a niece of the king, in 1208. Renaud and Simon of Dammartin would eventually ally themselves with John, King of England. In 1214 the brothers stood against Philip Augustus in the Battle of Bouvines. The French won the battle, and Renaud was imprisoned, while Simon was exiled.

Marie's father William IV, Count of Ponthieu had remained loyal to Philip Augustus. When William died in 1221, Philip Augustus denied Marie her inheritance and gave Ponthieu in custody to his cousin Robert III, Count of Dreux. After the death of Philip Augustus, Marie was able to negotiate an agreement with his successor Louis VIII in 1225. Ponthieu was held by the king, and Simon would only be allowed to enter this or any other fief if he obtained royal permission. In 1231 Simon agreed to the terms and added that he would not enter into marriage negotiations for his daughters without consent of the king.

Family
Simon married Marie, Countess of Ponthieu, the daughter of  William IV, Count of Ponthieu and Alys, Countess of the Vexin. Marie became Countess of Ponthieu in 1225.

Simon and his wife Marie had four daughters:
 Joan, Countess of Ponthieu (1220–1278), married 1) Ferdinand III of Castile. Mother of Eleanor of Castile, the wife of Edward I of England. Married 2) Jean de Nesle, Seigneur de Falvy et de La Hérelle.
 Mathilda of Dammartin (-1279), married John of Châtellerault
 Philippe of Dammartin (-1280), married 1) Raoul II of Lusignan, 2) Raoul II, Lord of Coucy, 3) Otto II, Count of Guelders.
 Maria of Dammartin, married John II, Count of Roucy.

References

Sources

1180 births
1239 deaths
13th-century French people
House of Dammartin
Counts of Ponthieu
Jure uxoris officeholders